One World Week is a United Kingdom development education charity and a series of events sponsored by it.  The week of events was founded in 1978 by the World Development Movement, and focuses on the week of that includes October 24 each year (United Nations Day).  Strictly, it is an octave rather than a week, since it both starts and finishes on a Sunday; thus in 2009 One World Week covered the eight days from October 18 to October 25.

One World Week aims to provide, "an opportunity for people from diverse backgrounds to come together to learn about global justice, to spread that learning and to use it to take action for justice locally and globally".  Originally oriented towards the Christian churches of the UK, it has now broadened in scope to include people of all backgrounds.

See also 
World Development Movement

References

External links 
Official OWW website

Development charities based in the United Kingdom